The Freemasons' Tavern was established in 1775 at 61–65 Great Queen Street in the West End of London. It served as a meeting place for a variety of notable organisations from the 18th century until it was demolished in 1909 to make way for the Connaught Rooms.

History

In 1769, the Premier Grand Lodge of England decided to build a Central Hall. A building was purchased in Great Queen Street in 1775 and Thomas Sandby was tasked with building a hall in the garden. The original house became the tavern with a second house providing office space for the Freemasons. In 1813 the Premier Grand Lodge and rival Ancient Grand Lodge of England merged to form the United Grand Lodge of England.

The hall was not only used for Masonic purposes, but also became an important venue in London for a variety of meetings and concerts. Organisations using the hall included:
 Political Economy Club 
 African Institution 
 British and Foreign Anti-Slavery Society, for the World Anti-Slavery Convention in 1840
 British and Foreign Bible Society
 Highland and Island Emigration Society
 The Football Association (FA) held its first meeting here on 26 October 1863

Connaught Rooms

In 1909 the Grand Lodge demolished most of the Freemasons' Tavern and replaced it over succeeding decades with a new building designed by H. V. Ashley and Winton Newman, who also designed the adjoining Freemasons' Hall. The new building, costing £30,000, was named the Connaught Rooms after the Lodge's Grand Master, Prince Arthur, Duke of Connaught and Strathearn.

After a further renovation by Friendly Hotels (later the Real Hotel Company) in the 1980s it reopened as the New Connaught Rooms, a hotel and conference centre. The art deco Grand Hall can seat 800 conference delegates. When the Real Hotel Company collapsed in 2009, Principal Hayley Group bought the venue, renamed it the Grand Connaught Rooms, and in 2016 placed it in its De Vere brand. In 2010 it became the first art deco building to be Grade II* listed.

References

External sites

Freemasonry
Covent Garden
Demolished buildings and structures in London
Buildings and structures demolished in 1909